The canton of Nemours is a French administrative division, located in the arrondissement of Fontainebleau, in the Seine-et-Marne département (Île-de-France région).

Demographics

Composition 
At the French canton reorganisation which came into effect in March 2015, the canton was expanded from 17 to 50 communes:

Arville
Aufferville
Bagneaux-sur-Loing
Beaumont-du-Gâtinais
Blennes
Bougligny
Bransles
Chaintreaux
Château-Landon
Châtenoy
Chenou
Chevrainvilliers
Chevry-en-Sereine
Darvault
Diant
Dormelles
Égreville
Faÿ-lès-Nemours
Flagy
Garentreville
La Genevraye
Gironville
Grez-sur-Loing
Ichy
Larchant
Lorrez-le-Bocage-Préaux
La Madeleine-sur-Loing
Maisoncelles-en-Gâtinais
Mondreville
Montcourt-Fromonville
Montigny-sur-Loing
Montmachoux
Nanteau-sur-Lunain
Nemours
Noisy-Rudignon
Nonville
Obsonville
Ormesson
Paley
Poligny
Remauville
Saint-Pierre-lès-Nemours
Souppes-sur-Loing
Thoury-Férottes
Treuzy-Levelay  
Vaux-sur-Lunain
Villebéon
Villemaréchal
Villemer
Voulx

See also
Cantons of the Seine-et-Marne department
Communes of the Seine-et-Marne department

References

Nemours